Ridgefield is a town in Fairfield County, Connecticut, United States. Situated in the foothills of the Berkshire Mountains, the 300-year-old community had a population of 25,033 at the 2020 census. The town center, which was formerly a borough, is defined by the U.S. Census Bureau as a census-designated place.

History

Ridgefield was first settled by English colonists from Norwalk and Milford in 1708, when a group of settlers purchased land from Chief Catoonah of the Ramapo tribe. The town was incorporated under a royal charter from the Connecticut General Assembly issued in 1709. Ridgefield was descriptively named. The most notable 18th-century event was the Battle of Ridgefield on April 27, 1777. This American Revolutionary War skirmish involved a small colonial militia force (state militia and some Continental Army soldiers), led by, among others, General David Wooster, who died in the engagement, and Benedict Arnold, whose horse was shot from under him. They faced a larger British force that had landed at  Westport and was returning from a raid on the colonial supply depot in Danbury. The battle was a tactical victory for the British but a strategic one for the Colonials because the British would never again conduct inland operations in Connecticut, despite western Connecticut's strategic importance in securing the Hudson River Valley. Today, the dead from both sides are buried together in a small cemetery on Main Street on the right of the entrance to Casagmo condominiums: "...foes in arms, brothers in death...". The Keeler Tavern, a local inn and museum, features a British cannonball still lodged in the side of the building. There are many other landmarks from the Revolutionary War in the town, with most along Main Street.

In the summer of 1781, the French army under the Comte de Rochambeau marched through Connecticut, encamping in the Ridgebury section of town, where the first Catholic mass in Ridgefield was offered.

For much of its three centuries, Ridgefield was a farming community.  Among the important families in the 19th century were the Rockwells and Lounsburys, which intermarried.  They produced two Connecticut governors, George Lounsbury and Phineas Lounsbury. The Ridgefield Veterans Memorial Community Center on Main Street, also called the Lounsbury House, was built by Gov. Phineas Chapman Lounsbury around 1896 as his primary residence. The Lounsbury Farm near the Florida section of Ridgefield is one of the only remaining operational farms in Ridgefield.

These and dozens of other estates became unaffordable and unwieldy during and after the Great Depression, and most were broken up. Many mansions were razed. In their place came subdivisions of one- and  lots that turned the town into a suburban, bedroom community in the 1950s, 1960s, and 1970s. However, strict planning and zoning has frozen development and locked in the aesthetic appearance of the 19th- and early 20th-century through to the 21st-century, especially along its famous mile-long Main Street.

In 1946, Ridgefield was one of the locations considered for the United Nations Secretariat building, but was not chosen due to its relative inaccessibility.

Geography

The town is bordered by the towns of North Salem and Lewisboro in Westchester County, New York to the west, Danbury to the north, Wilton to the south and Redding to the east.

The Metro-North Railroad’s Branchville station is in the Branchville corner of town. Other locales within the town include Titicus on Route 116 just north of the village; Ridgebury in the northern section of town; Scotland, which is south of Ridgebury; Farmingville, located northeast and east of the town center; Limestone, located northeast of the town center; Flat Rock, located south of the town center; and Florida, located just north of Branchville.

Geology 

The landscape is strewn with countless rocks deposited by glaciers, and among the town's bodies of water is Round Pond, formed in a kettle left by the last glacier 20,000 years ago. Another interesting body of water in the town is Mamanasco Lake, an  lake near Ridgefield High School. A particularly interesting feature is Cameron's Line, named for Eugene N. Cameron, who discovered that rocks west of the line differed greatly from those east of it. This fault line was formed some 250 million years ago by the collision of "Proto North America" and "Proto Africa", and there are still occasional light earthquakes felt along its length. The line bisects the southern half of the town, running generally north of West Lane, across the north end of the village, past the south end of Great Swamp and generally easterly into Redding in the Topstone area. North of Cameron's Line, the town is rich in limestone. The mineral was extensively mined, and remnants of several limekilns exist today. Also mined here in the 19th century was mica, pegmatite, and quartz. Gold, as well as gemstones such as garnet and beryl, have been found here, and dozens of minerals have been unearthed at the old Branchville Mica Quarry. Uraninite, a source of uranium, is found here, too.

Climate

Demographics

As of the census of 2000, there were 23,643 people, 8,433 households, and 6,611 families residing in the town. The racial makeup of the town was 96.12% White, 0.62% Black or African American, 0.09% Native American, 2.08% Asian, 0.03% Pacific Islander, 0.36% from other races, and 0.70% from two or more races. Hispanic or Latino of any race were 1.97% of the population.

There were 8,433 households, out of which 43.0% had children under the age of 18 living with them, 70.6% were married couples living together, 6.0% had a female householder with no husband present, and 21.6% were non-families. 18.9% of all households were made up of individuals, and 7.5% had someone living alone who was 65 years of age or older.  The average household size was 2.78 and the average family size was 3.21.

In the town, the population was spread out, with 30.6% under the age of 18, 3.2% from 18 to 24, 27.8% from 25 to 44, 27.5% from 45 to 64, and 10.9% who were 65 years of age or older.  The median age was 39 years. For every 100 females, there were 92.8 males.  For every 100 females age 18 and over, there were 89.4 males.

The median income for a household in the town was $107,351, and the median income for a family was $127,981 (these figures had risen to $125,909 and $154,346 respectively as of a 2007 estimate). Males had a median income of $100,000 versus $50,236 for females. The per capita income for the town was $51,795.  About 1.3% of families and 2.4% of the population were below the poverty line, 5.3% of those age 65 or over.

As of the census of 2000, there were 7,212 people, 2,933 households, and 1,994 families residing in the CDP. The racial makeup of the CDP was 95.52% White, 0.54% Black or African American, 0.11% Native American, 2.44% Asian, 0.01% Pacific Islander, 0.51% from other races, and 0.86% from two or more races, while 2.26% of the population were Hispanic or Latino of any race.

There were 2,933 households, out of which 34.4% had children under the age of 18 living with them, 57.7% were married couples living together, 8.1% had a female householder with no husband present, and 32.0% were non-families. Of all households, 28.5% were made up of individuals, and 12.3% had someone living alone who was 65 years of age or older.  The average household size was 2.46 and the average family size was 3.05.

In the CDP the population was spread out, with 26.9% under the age of 18, 3.3% from 18 to 24, 28.5% from 25 to 44, 27.9% from 45 to 64, and 13.4% who were 65 years of age or older.  The median age was 41 years.  For every 100 females, there were 89.4 males.  For every 100 females age 18 and over, there were 85.5 males.

The median income for a household in the CDP was $81,179, and the median income for a family was $127,327. Males had a median income of $93,084 versus $47,232 for females. The per capita income for the CDP was $46,843.  3.2% of the population and 1.7% of families were below the poverty line.  Out of the total population, 1.6% of those under the age of 18 and 6.8% of those 65 and older were living below the poverty line.

Arts and culture

The Western Connecticut Youth Orchestra, formerly called the Ridgefield Symphony Youth Orchestra, has performed at Carnegie Hall and Avery Fisher Hall at the Lincoln Center.

The Ridgefield Symphony Orchestra began as the "Ridgefield Symphonette" in 1965 with 20 players, only a third of them professionals. It became fully professional by the end of the decade and today has 75 musicians and draws soloists of international reputation. In 1984, Maxim Shostakovich, then a Ridgefielder, conducted a sold-out concert of music by his father, Dmitri Shostakovich, with the composer's grandson, Dmitri, performing as piano soloist.

The Keeler Tavern Museum preserves an early 18th-century house that, by the time of the Revolution, had become a tavern and inn. The tavern was a center of community activities, an early post office, and a stop on the northern New York to Boston post road. In the early 20th century, it was the home of noted architect Cass Gilbert. The tavern is open several days a week, offers tours, and has a gift shop.

The Aldrich Contemporary Art Museum is a leading venue for the world's best contemporary artists. Its exhibitions have attracted national attention and respect. The museum was redesigned and expanded in 2004, and offers many special programs, including concerts.

The Ridgefield Playhouse, opened in December 2000, is housed in the former Ridgefield Alternate High School auditorium, and was remodeled as a playhouse. It is the year-round venue for dozens of concerts and other performances, many by internationally known artists. The Playhouse also shows movies, many of them first-run.

Weir Farm National Historic Site, which straddles the Ridgefield-Wilton border, preserves much of the farm of J. Alden Weir (1852–1919), a painter of the American Impressionism style. The property was later used by his son-in-law, Mahonri Young (1877–1957), noted sculptor and a grandson of Brigham Young. The site includes the Weir Farm Art Center and a gallery, and many special events take place there, including shows by visiting artists in residence. Weir Farm is one of only two official National Park Service units in the state.

The Ridgefield Conservatory of Dance was founded as the Ridgefield Studio of Classical Ballet in 1965 by Patricia Schuster. In 2002 it became the Ridgefield Conservatory of Dance, a non-profit 501(c)3 organization. The Conservatory is home to three pre-professional performance companies: the Ridgefield Civic Ballet, The Junior Dance Ensemble, and the Contemporary Dance Ensemble. The conservatory presents The Nutcracker annually at the Ridgefield Playhouse.

Thrown Stone Theatre Company is a professional theatre company in town that focuses primarily on new work.

Located at the intersection of West Lane and Route 35, the Peter Parley Schoolhouse, also known as the Little Red Schoolhouse or the West Lane Schoolhouse, is a one-room schoolhouse in use by the town until 1913. The site and grounds are maintained by the Ridgefield Garden Club. The building is open certain Sundays and displays the desks, slates, and books the children used.

Ridgefield's public open space includes Aldrich Park, Bennett's Pond State Park, Brewster Farm, Florida Refuge, Hemlock Hills/Lake Windwing, Pine Mountain, Seth Low Pierrepont State Park, and the Weir Farm National Historic Site. Its public open spaces make up , accounting for 23% of the towns overall land.

Ridgefield Golf Course is the town's municipal 18 hole golf course designed by George Fazio and Tom Fazio and opened in 1974.

The town's largest industry is Boehringer Ingelheim Pharmaceuticals, whose United States headquarters are located in the Ridgebury section of town.

In 2006, the Rockefeller Center Christmas Tree selected to be displayed in New York's Rockefeller Center for the Christmas season came from Ridgefield.

The town also features a skatepark, owned by the town and maintained by the town's parks and recreation service, in which both skateboarding and aggressive inline skating are done. In 2010 the skatepark was rebuilt and expanded as a result of the need to expand the Ridgefield Playhouse parking lot.

Annual events 

The Nutmeg Festival on Main Street is in August. It has been organized by St. Stephen's Church and held on its grounds since 1906, when it was started there as an "apron and cake sale" by the Ladies Guild to raise money for charity. However, as of 2019, the Nutmeg Festival has been discontinued due to supposed finance issues with St. Stephen's church.
The Antiques Flea Market is held every June outdoors on the grounds of the Veterans Memorial Community Center.
 A local farmers market is held every Thursday during the summer months.

On the National Register of Historic Places

Part of the town center is a historic district listed on the National Register of Historic Places (NRHP) as Ridgefield Center Historic District. The district was added to the Register in 1984 and includes representations of mid-19th-century revival, Late Victorian, and Colonial revival architectural styles.  Noted architect Cass Gilbert purchased historic Keeler Tavern within the district and renovated it for his use as a summer home.  Roughly bounded by Pound Street, Fairview Avenue, Prospect Ridge, and Whipstick Roads, the district was added on October 7, 1984.  In addition to the town center historic district, there are a number of individual properties and at least one other historic district in the town that are NRHP-listed:
 Benedict House and Shop: 57 Rockwell Road (added 1998)
 Branchville Railroad Tenement: Old Main Highway (added 1982)
 Frederic Remington House: 154 Barry Ave. (added 1966)
 Hugh Cain Fulling Mill and Elias Glover Woolen Mill Archeological Site (added 1985)
 J. Alden Weir Farm Historic District: 735 Nod Hill Road and Pelham Lane (added 1984; see Weir Farm National Historic Site, below)
 Keeler Tavern: 132 Main St. (added 1982)
 Lewis June House: 478 N. Salem Road (added 1984)
 March Route of Rochambeau's Army: Ridgebury Road: Ridgebury Road, from intersection with Old Stagecoach South (added 2003)
 Phineas Chapman Lounsbury House: 316 Main Street, also known as the Ridgefield Veterans Memorial Community Center (added 1975)
 Ridgebury Congregational Church: Ridgebury Road and George Washington Highway (added 1984)
 Thomas Hyatt House: 11 Barlow Mountain Road (added 1984)
 West Mountain Historic District: state road 855 (formerly Route 102) (added 1984)

Government and politics

Ridgefield has a traditional New England Board of Selectmen–Town Meeting form of government, which is created by Town Charter and approved by the voters. The Charter calls for an annual Town and Budget Meeting to be held on the first Monday of May each year. The following are the elective offices of the Town of Ridgefield: Board of Selectmen, Town Clerk, Town Treasurer and Tax Collector. The following are the elective boards and commissions of the Town of Ridgefield: Board of Education, Planning and Zoning Commission, Board of Appeals on Zoning, Board of Tax Review, Board of Police Commissioners and Board of Finance. The chief executive is The First Selectman, who also serves a legislative function as a member of the Board of Selectmen. The current First Selectman, Rudy Marconi (D), was first elected in 1999.

Education

Ridgefield has nine public schools and two private schools. The public schools are managed by Ridgefield Public Schools. The six public elementary schools are Veterans Park, Branchville, Farmingville, Scotland, Barlow Mountain, and Ridgebury. Scotts Ridge Middle School (Ridgefield's newest school) and East Ridge are the town's two middle schools. The high school is Ridgefield High School. The high school's teams are called the Tigers.

Ridgefield's Roman Catholic schools are St. Mary, serving preschool through eighth grade, and St. Padre Pio Academy, serving kindergarten through eighth grade and run by the Society of St. Pius X.

Ridgefield Academy is a co-educational, independent school serving preschool through eighth grade, situated on a  turn-of-the-20th-century estate on West Mountain that was once home to the Congregation de Notre Dame.

There are also various preschools and a Montessori school.

Infrastructure
ElectricityEversource Energy
WaterAquarion serves central and west parts of town (down Route 33 south to St. Johns Road, north along Route 35 to Farmingville, west to the Eleven Levels area and West Lane). Small water companies serve some other parts of town. The water line was recently extended up North Street to Barlow Mountain and Scotland Elementary Schools, a proposal that took years to pass.
Telephone/internetFrontier Communications
Cable television/telephone/internetComcast Cable in Danbury
Local newspaperThe Ridgefield Press
Public transportation by trainthe Metro-North Railroad’s Danbury Branch, which is a part of the New Haven Line, serves Branchville station, a commuter rail stop. Northbound diesel trains will travel to Danbury station, and southbound trains will travel to South Norwalk station. During peak hours on weekdays, some trains will travel as far as Stamford Transportation Center, and express trains to Grand Central Terminal.
Public transportation by busHousatonic Area Regional Transit (HART), the bus system serving Greater Danbury. HART operates a weekday commuter shuttle between Katonah station and the park and ride lots at 207 Main St. and 58 Prospect Ridge.

Neighborhoods 
Ridgefield is predominantly made up of 20 encompassing neighborhoods. Ridgefield, Main Street, Branchville, Titicus, Farmingville, Ridgebury, Topstone, West Mountain, Cooper Hill, Ramapoo, Route 7, Georgetown, Deer Run, Peaceable Hill, Quail Ride, Westmoreland, Twixt Hills, Long Ridge, Starrs/Picketts Ridge, and Lake Waubeeka.

Notable people

See: List of people from Ridgefield, Connecticut

Dr Evan Scott Levine, 1961

Author of What Your Doctor Won’t (or Can’t) Tell You.

References

Images of America: Ridgefield (1999) 127 pages; 1890s to 1950s.
Ridgefield 1900–1950, by Jack Sanders (2003) 126 pages
Farmers against the Crown, by Keith Jones. An account of the Battle of Ridgefield during the Revolutionary War. 162 pages, paperback (2002)
The Farms of Farmingville, by Keith Marshall Jones, 509 pages (2001)
Five Village Walks, by Jack Sanders, 56 pages
Ridgefield in Review, by Silvio A. Bedini (1958) Out of print, but used copies often available locally
History of Ridgefield, by George L. Rockwell, 583 pages, long out of print
The Barbour Collection of Connecticut Town Records, Volume 36, an index to Ridgefield births, marriages and deaths from 1709 to 1850. Genealogical Publishing Company (2000)
The History of Ridgefield, Connecticut, by the Rev. Daniel Teller (1878), 251 pages. Teller was pastor of the First Congregational Church.
The Proprietors of Ridgefield, by Glenna M. Welsh (1976)
St. Stephen's Church: Its History for 250 years: 1725 to 1975, by Robert S. Haight, 220 pages,
Saint Stephen's Church Reaches the Millennium, by Dirk Bollenback, 114 pages, covers 1975 to 2000.
Lost in Place: Growing Up Absurd in Suburbia, by Mark Salzman (1996), 288 pages, Ridgefield native reflects on the idiosyncrasies and absurdities of suburban Connecticut life.

Footnotes

External links

 Town of Ridgefield official website

 
Populated places established in 1708
Towns in Connecticut
Towns in Fairfield County, Connecticut
Towns in the New York metropolitan area
1709 establishments in Connecticut